Alyssa Manley (born May 27, 1994) is an American field hockey player. She was named to the United States woman's field hockey team for the 2016 Summer Olympics in Rio de Janeiro.Won a Galway ladies football junior medal with Salthill/Knocknacarr in 2022 (October). Manley played at full forward vs St Fursey’s Headford. She followed up with the winning goal in the All Ireland junior final vs Naomh Abán.

Early life
Manley's hometown is Lititz, Pennsylvania. She began playing field hockey in eighth grade. As a student at Warwick High School she played both field hockey and lacrosse.

Collegiate field hockey player
Manley attended Syracuse University, where she played on the school's field hockey team. Manley was part of Syracuse's first ever national championship woman's field hockey team in 2015. The victory was the first ever for the school in any woman's sport.

The Collegiate Women Sports Awards awarded Manley the Honda Sports Award for field hockey in December 2015. That same year, Manley was also voted Atlantic Coast Conference Defensive Player of the Year.

United States national woman's field hockey
Manley's first international game with the United States national women's field hockey team came on February 14, 2015. The United States tied Argentina with a score of 1–1. Manley is a midfielder who plays the screen position for the team. On July 1, 2016 Manely was named to the United States women's field hockey team for the 2016 Summer Olympics in Rio de Janeiro.

References

External links
 

1994 births
Living people
American female field hockey players
Syracuse Orange field hockey players
Olympic field hockey players of the United States
Field hockey players at the 2016 Summer Olympics
People from Lititz, Pennsylvania
Female field hockey defenders
Pan American Games bronze medalists for the United States
Pan American Games medalists in field hockey
Field hockey players at the 2019 Pan American Games
Medalists at the 2019 Pan American Games